Bertram Elijah Leavens (March 2, 1886 – December 22, 1953) was a politician in Ontario, Canada. He served as a CCF member of the Legislative Assembly of Ontario from 1943 to 1945 and 1948 to 1951. He represented the downtown Toronto riding of Woodbine.

Background
The son of John Wesley Leavens and Elizabeth Haycroft, he was born in Owen Sound, Ontario.

Bertram married Myrtle May Leavens (nee Webb) on September 11, 1911 in Owen Sound, Ontario. They had 3 sons (William John (1912-1982), Bertram Elijah (1918-1918) and Charles Wesley (1920-1976)) and a daughter (Eva Lorraine (1914-1974)).

Politics
Leavens ran unsuccessfully for the Greenwood seat in the Canadian House of Commons in 1935 and 1940 as a CCF candidate, losing both times to Denton Massey.

In the 1943 provincial election, he ran as a CCF candidate in the downtown Toronto riding of Woodbine.

References

1886 births
1953 deaths
Ontario Co-operative Commonwealth Federation MPPs
People from Owen Sound
20th-century Canadian politicians